Year 1326 (MCCCXXVI) was a common year starting on Wednesday (link will display the full calendar) of the Julian calendar.

Events 
 January–December 
 January 21 – The foundation of Oriel College, the University of Oxford's fifth oldest (still surviving) college, is confirmed by royal charter.
 February 10–March 11 – Raid on Brandenburg: Allied forces of the Kingdom of Poland, led by Władysław I the Elbow-high, and of the Grand Duchy of Lithuania, led by the pagan Gediminas, raid Louis V of Germany's Margraviate of Brandenburg (within the Holy Roman Empire), with the sanction of Pope John XXII.
 April 19 – A peace treaty in the Flemish peasant revolt, 1323-1328, is ratified.
 June 3 – The Treaty of Novgorod delineates the border between Russia and Norway in Finnmark.
 August 27 – A marriage contract is drawn up between Prince Edward (the future Edward III of England) and Philippa of Hainault, guaranteeing that the wedding will take place within two years.
 September 24 – England is invaded by Isabella of France and Roger Mortimer.
 October – Ibn Battuta reaches Mecca.

 Date unknown 
 Orhan I succeeds Osman I, on the throne of the Ottoman Empire.
 Ingeborg of Norway is deposed from political power in Sweden.
 The use of the word "cannon" is first recorded in reference to a firearm.
 Clare College, the University of Cambridge's second oldest (still surviving) college, is founded.

Births 
 March 5 – King Louis I of Hungary (d. 1382)
 March 30 – Ivan II of Russia, Grand Duke of Muscovy (d. 1359)
 May 1 – Rinchinbal Khan, Emperor Ningzong of Yuan (d. 1332)
 May 8 – Joanna I of Auvergne, queen consort of France (d. 1360)
 June 29 – Murad I, Ottoman sultan (d. 1389)
 date unknown
 Olivier de Clisson (The Butcher), French soldier (d. 1407)
 Robert of Durazzo, Neapolitan nobleman (d. 1356)
Prince Narinaga, Japanese Shōgun (d. in either 1337 or 1344, the sources are contradictory) 
 Imagawa Sadayo, Japanese poet and soldier (d. 1420)
 Isaac ben Sheshet, Spanish Talmudic authority (d. 1408)
 probable
 Manuel Kantakouzenos, despot of Morea (d. 1380)
 Seii, King of Chuzan (d. 1349)
 Simeon Uroš, self-proclaimed Emperor of Serbs and Greeks (d. 1370)

Deaths 
 January 18 – Robert FitzWalter, 1st Baron FitzWalter, English baron (b. 1247)
 February 28 – Leopold I, Duke of Austria (b. 1290)
 March 26 – Alessandra Giliani, Italian anatomist (b. c. 1307)
 April 29 – Blanche of Burgundy, former queen consort of France (b. c. 1296)
 May 31 – Maurice de Berkeley, 2nd Baron Berkeley, English rebel baron (b. 1271)
 July 29 – Richard Óg de Burgh, 2nd Earl of Ulster (b. 1259)
 October 15 – Walter de Stapledon, English bishop (b. 1261)
 October 27 – Hugh le Despenser, 1st Earl of Winchester (executed; b. 1262)
 November 17 – Edmund FitzAlan, 9th Earl of Arundel, English politician (b. 1285)
 November 25 – Prince Koreyasu, Japanese shōgun (b. 1264)
 November 24 – Hugh the younger Despenser, English knight (executed; b. 1286)
 December 20 – Peter, Metropolitan of Moscow
 December 28 – Sir David II Strathbogie, Earl of Atholl, Constable of Scotland, and Chief Warden of Northumberland
 date unknown
 Mondino de Liuzzi, Italian anatomist (born c. 1270)
 Osman I, founder of the Ottoman Empire (b. 1258)
 John Palaiologos, Byzantine nobleman (b. 1288 or 1289)
 Ser Petracco, notary public of the Republic of Florence, father of Petrarch (b. 1267)

References